Good Behavior is an American drama television series based on the novel of the same name by Blake Crouch. The series stars Michelle Dockery as Leticia "Letty" Raines, a professional thief who becomes involved with a hitman named Javier Pereira, played by Juan Diego Botto.

TNT picked up the pilot to a 10-episode series in December 2015. The series premiered on November 15, 2016. On January 14, 2017, it was renewed for a second season, which premiered on October 15, 2017.

On November 6, 2018, TNT canceled the series after two seasons.

Overview
Letty Raines—a thief, con artist, and drug user—is released from prison on good behavior, and is intent on regaining custody of her 10-year-old son Jacob. Her mother, Estelle, has custody and, because of Letty's incarceration, has a restraining order of protection that restricts contact. Letty infrequently sees her parole officer, Christian, who is exasperated by her attitude and lack of progress. While robbing a hotel room, Letty hides in the closet and overhears a discussion about a contract killing. Her unsuccessful effort to prevent the killing creates a series-long involvement with the killer, Javier, to the point of a complicated personal relationship.

Cast

Main cast
 Michelle Dockery as Leticia 'Letty' Raines
 Juan Diego Botto as Javier Pereira
 Lusia Strus as Estelle Raines, Letty's mother
 Terry Kinney as Christian Woodhill, Letty's parole officer
 Nyles Steele as Jacob Raines, Letty's son
 Joey Kern as Rob McDaniels, Estelle's boyfriend, a high-school acquaintance of Letty's (season 2; recurring in season 1)

Recurring cast
 Ann Dowd as Rhonda Lashever, a tenacious FBI agent determined to catch Javier
 María Botto as Ava, Javier's sister
 Todd Williams as Sean, Letty's ex-boyfriend, Jacob's father
 Gideon Emery as Silk, Ava's ex-husband, a mortuary worker who disposes of bodies for Javier
 Collette Wolfe as Tiffany Dash, a friend of Letty's from high school (season 1)
 Justin Bruening as Kyle Dash, Tiffany's husband (season 1)
 Laura Bell Bundy as Carin, Javier and Letty's temporary neighbor and friend (season 2)
 Juan Riedinger as Teo, a childhood friend of Javier & former lover of Ava who reenters their lives unexpectedly

Episodes

Reception
Good Behavior has received mostly positive reviews from television critics. Review aggregator website Rotten Tomatoes reported a 78% "fresh" rating based on 23 reviews. The website's consensus reads, "Emotional manipulation aside, Good Behavior is a legitimately suspenseful and sexy drama." Metacritic reported a score of 65 out of 100 based on 22 reviews, indicating "generally favorable reviews".

Filming
The series was filmed predominantly in Wilmington, North Carolina, both on location and at EUE/Screen Gems studios. The pilot was filmed from September to October 2015, while season one was filmed from March to July 2016. Filming for season two began on April 10, 2017, and ended on September 8, 2017.

References

External links
 
 

2016 American television series debuts
2017 American television series endings
2010s American crime drama television series
English-language television shows
TNT (American TV network) original programming
Television shows filmed in North Carolina 
Television shows filmed in Wilmington, North Carolina
Television series by ITV Studios
Works about contract killers
Television series by Studio T
Television shows based on American novels